Schizotrema is a genus of lichen-forming fungi in the family Graphidaceae. The genus was circumscribed in 2009 by Armin Mangold and H. Thorsten Lumbsch.

Species
Schizotrema flavolucens 
Schizotrema guadeloupense 
Schizotrema quercicola 
Schizotrema schizolomum 
Schizotrema subzebrinum  – New South Wales
Schizotrema vezdanum  – Tasmania
Schizotrema zebrinum  – New South Wales

The species once known as Schizotrema cryptotrema  is now Cryptoschizotrema cryptotrema.

References

Graphidaceae
Lichen genera
Ostropales genera
Taxa described in 2009
Taxa named by Helge Thorsten Lumbsch